Bogdan Alexandrovich Kiselevich (born 14 February 1990) is a Russian professional ice hockey defenceman currently playing for CSKA Moscow in the Kontinental Hockey League (KHL). He has formerly played in the National Hockey League (NHL) with the Florida Panthers.

Playing career
Kiselevich played spent his youth career with HC Severstal Cherepovets. Subsequently, he played nine seasons for Severstal in the KHL. On 9 May 2014, Kiselevich was traded to powerhouse CSKA Moscow. He subsequently agreed to a new two-year contract.

On 2 June 2018, Kiselevich as a free agent signed a one-year, one-way contract with the Florida Panthers of the NHL for the 2018–19 season. After attending the Panthers 2018 training camp, Kiselevich made the opening season roster, he made his NHL debut with Florida in a 3–2 defeat to the Vancouver Canucks at the BB&T Center in Sunrise, Florida on October 13, 2018. In his second game he registered his first point, an assist on a goal by Evgenii Dadonov, in a 6–5 shootout loss to the Philadelphia Flyers on October 16, 2018. Kiselevich rotated among the Panthers depth defenseman to appear in 32 games for 8 assists. At the trade deadline on 25 February 2019, he was traded by the Panthers to the Winnipeg Jets. Kiselevich joined the Jets, serving as a healthy scratch for the remainder of the regular season and playoffs.

On 1 July 2019, Kiselevich left the Jets and the NHL as a free agent, opting to return to the KHL with former club CSKA Moscow, on a three-year contract.

International play

Kiselevich made his international debut with Russia at the 2017 World Championships. He was later selected to represent the Olympic Athletes from Russia team at the 2018 Winter Olympics. He contributed 2 assists in 6 games to claim the gold medal in Pyeongchang, Korea.

Career statistics

Regular season and playoffs

International

Awards and honors

References

External links

1990 births
Living people
HC CSKA Moscow players
People from Cherepovets
Florida Panthers players
Ice hockey players at the 2018 Winter Olympics
Olympic ice hockey players of Russia
Medalists at the 2018 Winter Olympics
Olympic medalists in ice hockey
Olympic gold medalists for Olympic Athletes from Russia
Russian ice hockey defencemen
Severstal Cherepovets players
Undrafted National Hockey League players
Sportspeople from Vologda Oblast